A brake check, also known as a brake test, occurs when a driver deliberately either taps on the brakes several times or slams hard on the pedal when moving in front of another vehicle, with the intention of causing the behind driver to either collide or take evasive action. The term is often applied in the context of auto racing.

Legality
In most jurisdictions of the world, brake checking is often considered a crime and falls under laws pertaining to reckless driving, aggressive driving, or stunt driving. The Washington State Department of Licensing includes brake checking as a symptom of aggressive driving. Legal experts in Ontario consider it to fall under that province's stunt driving laws. Chatham-Kent Ontario Provincial Police charged a man in 2018 with the crime of Race a motor vehicle after being observed brake checking another driver on Highway 401.

In motorsports
The concept of brake checking is often seen in auto racing, with several drivers being accused of, or admitting to, brake checking competitors for various reasons. An incident in the 2017 Formula 1 Azerbaijan Grand Prix between Lewis Hamilton and Sebastian Vettel was attributed to Vettel's belief that he had been brake checked by Hamilton.

In 2018, an on-track incident between NASCAR drivers Kevin Harvick and Denny Hamlin at the spring Martinsville Speedway race ended in what Autoweek's Matt Weaver described as, "Harvick...slamming on his brakes, the resulting contact severely damaging the nose on Hamlin’s Toyota." Hamlin would later comment that "I should have brake checked him first."

References

External links

Motorsport terminology
Driving techniques
Hazardous motor vehicle activities